The Government of Moscow is the highest executive body of state authority of Moscow. The Government of Moscow is headed by the highest official of the city of Moscow, i.e. the Mayor of Moscow.

The members of the Government of Moscow are the Mayor of Moscow, the Deputy Mayors of Moscow in the Moscow Government and the Moscow Government ministers. The Government of Moscow issues orders that are signed by the Mayor of Moscow. The Government of Moscow has legal personality. Structure and functioning of the Government of Moscow are established by the law of Moscow, adopted by Moscow City Duma.

According to the Constitution of Russia, Moscow is a federal subject of the Russia, known as a city of federal importance.

See also
 Administrative divisions of Moscow
 Moscow City Duma
 Charter of the city of Moscow
 Federal cities of Russia

References

External links 
 

 
Politics of Moscow